Odostomia brandhorsti is a species of sea snail, a marine gastropod mollusk in the family Pyramidellidae, the pyrams and their allies.

Description
The size of the shell of this micromollusc varies between 1.4 mm and 1.9 mm.

Distribution
This species occurs in the following locations:
 Cape Verde
 São Tomé and Príncipe

References

External links
 
 To Encyclopedia of Life

brandhorsti
Gastropods described in 1998
Molluscs of the Atlantic Ocean
Gastropods of Cape Verde
Invertebrates of São Tomé and Príncipe